Fruit at the Bottom is the second studio album by American pop duo Wendy & Lisa, released in 1989 by Columbia Records. The album peaked at No. 119 on the US Billboard 200, No. 71 on the US R&B Albums chart and No. 45 on the UK Albums Chart.

Album history
Wendy Melvoin's twin sister Susannah and Cole Ynda, Lisa's sister, contributed background vocal work to the record as well as touring extensively with their sisters.

Singles released from the album included "Are You My Baby" (UK No. 70) and "Lolly Lolly" (UK No. 64), the latter of which was remixed by Wendy and Lisa's former boss Prince. "Satisfaction" was also released as a single and became a Top 30 hit in the UK (No. 27).

Although the original UK album contained 10 tracks like the US release, Virgin Records in the UK reissued it later in 1989 with four bonus tracks. The album was reissued in the US in 2006 by Wounded Bird Records containing five bonus tracks, and was reissued in the UK in 2011 by Cherry Red Records containing six bonus tracks.

Track listing
All songs written by Wendy Melvoin and Lisa Coleman, except where indicated

Side one
 "Lolly Lolly" – 4:41
 "Are You My Baby?" – 4:48
 "Satisfaction" (Coleman, Melvoin, Jesse Johnson) – 5:12
 "Always in My Dreams" – 4:17
 "Everyday" – 4:06

Side two
"From Now On (We're One)" – 4:31
 "Tears of Joy" – 4:39
 "Someday I" – 3:06
 "I Think It Was December" – 4:50
 "Fruit at the Bottom" – 4:33

Bonus track editions
Limited edition double package (UK, 1989)
 "Waterfall '89" (Alice & Sundial Seven) – 4:20
 "Satisfaction" (12" Dance Mix) – 7:14
 "Are You My Baby" (7" remix) –  4:18
 "Lolly Lolly" (Random Dance Mix) – 7:26

Wounded Birds Records (US, 2006)
 "Are You My Baby" (7" Remix) – 4:03
 "Happy Birthday" – 4:01
 "Are You My Baby" (My Man's 12") - 7:37
 "Satisfaction" (12" Dance Mix) - 7:19
 "Lolly Lolly" (Random Dance Mix) - 7:26

Cherry Pop/Virgin special edition (UK, 2011)
 "Are You My Baby" (7" Remix) – 4:18
 "Happy Birthday" – 3:58
 "Lolly Lolly" (According to Prince) – 4:17
 "Hip Hop Love" – 5:02
 "Are You My Baby" (My Man's 12") – 7:36
 "Satisfaction" (12" Dance Mix) – 7:14

Personnel
Credits are adapted from the Fruit at the Bottom liner notes.

Wendy & Lisa
 Wendy Melvoin – lead and background vocals, guitars, bass, drums, programming
 Lisa Coleman – lead and background vocals, all piano and keyboards, programming

Additional musicians
 Susannah Melvoin – background vocals
 Cole Ynda – background vocals
 Carla Azar – drums
 Jesse Johnson – guitar on "Satisfaction"

Charts

References

External links

Wendy & Lisa albums
1989 albums
Columbia Records albums